The United Front Department of the Workers' Party of Korea (UFD) is a department of the Central Committee of the Workers' Party of Korea (WPK) tasked with relations with South Korea. It conducts propaganda operations and espionage and manages front organizations, including the Chongryon.

History
The United Front Department (UFD) is one of the most longstanding and important departments of the party. It was initially known as the Culture Department (munhwabu). It was one of many organizations tasked with targeting South Korea at the time. In 1977 its operations were revived and it got its current name.

During the rule of Kim Jong-il, the department had its ups and downs. UFD is known to have meddled in the 1997 South Korean presidential election and tried to prevent the election of Kim Dae-jung. It was the subject of major purges in 2006, 2007, and 2008. There were apparently issues with corruption and lack of oversight.

Organization
Administratively, UFD reports as an agency of the Secretariat of the Central Committee of the Workers' Party of Korea (SCCWPK). UFD is in charge of espionage, diplomacy, and policy-making concerning South Korea. It is the primary organization of all state and party organizations that are tasked with relations with South Korea. The Ministry of Foreign Affairs, for instance, does not address relations with the South. Of the other organizations dealing with South Korea, the UFD differs in conducting its activities in the open. It also controls North Korea's religious organizations, including the Korean Christian Federation and Korean Buddhist Federation .

UFD is part of a shadowy group of Central Committee organizations known as the "Third Building". Not much is known about these organizations because South Korean intelligence services have been reluctant to release information out of security concerns. Out of the "Third Building" organizations, UFD is specifically tasked with maintaining ties with front organizations in both North and South Korea and with overseas Koreans. One of the most powerful of these, the Chongryon representing pro-Pyongyang Zainichi Koreans in Japan, is controlled by the UFD. Other front organizations controlled by the UFD include the Korean Association of Social Scientists, Korea Asia-Pacific Peace Committee, National Reconciliation Council, and the Committee for the Peaceful Reunification of the Fatherland. North Korea typically deals with front organizations instead of the South Korean government which lacks legitimacy in its eyes. UFD also sends spies to Japan. Accordingly, it is sometimes classified as an intelligence agency.

UFD is based in a complex in Junseung-dong in the Moranbong District of Pyongyang. It shares the complex with the Social Culture Department and Operations Department. It has about 3,000 employees. Certain members are among the most influential people in North Korea. The current director is Kim Yong-chol.

UFD handles affairs of the Kaesong Industrial Region. It tends to view the region as a manageable risk with a high profit, which is not universally agreed upon in the North Korean administration. UFD is also normally tasked with the Mount Kumgang Tourist Region. When relations with South Korea take a turn for the worse, other organizations are known to take UFD's responsibilities. For instance, in 2008 the National Defence Commission took over relations with the South.

Propaganda
UFD controls broadcasts that target South Korea. Its methods include psychological warfare through the radio and TV, loudspeakers, leaflets, visual displays, and websites. According to reports, "The United Front Department wages its cyber psychological warfare through some 140 sites with servers based in 19 countries. In 2011, North Korean agents posted 27,090 items of propaganda materials against the South, and in 2012 some 41,373". It also maintains a team of internet trolls with the Reconnaissance General Bureau. The radio station targeting South Korea, is directly controlled by the UFD instead of the Korean Central Broadcasting Committee that normally manages external broadcasting.

UFD often releases statements that are considered to be authoritative comments of the regime. It also fabricates praise of the Kim family that it attributes to foreigners and then disseminates in North Korean media.

Jang Jin-sung, a poet and North Korean defector, worked for the UFD before escaping the country. He has chronicled his work at the department in his book Dear Leader: My Escape from North Korea (2014).

See also

 Korean reunification
 North Korea–South Korea relations
 United front
 United Front Work Department of the Chinese Communist Party
 Propaganda in North Korea
Inter-Korean summits
Kim Yong-sun, former vice chairman of UFD

References

Works cited

Further reading
 
 

North Korean propaganda organizations
Central Committee of the Workers' Party of Korea
North Korea–South Korea relations
North Korean entities subject to the U.S. Department of the Treasury sanctions